María de las Mercedes, often shortened to simply Mercedes, is a Spanish given name. It refers to the Virgin of Mercy (Spanish: La Virgen de la Merced or Nuestra Señora de las Mercedes), one of the titles of Mary.

Notable people with this given name include:

 Mercedes of Orléans (Maria de las Mercedes of Orléans), (1860 – 1878) was Queen of Spain
Princess María de las Mercedes of Bourbon-Two Sicilies (1910-2000)
María de las Mercedes, Princess of Asturias (María de las Mercedes de Borbón y Habsburgo-Lorena) (1880-1904)
Maria de las Mercedes of Bavaria and Bourbon (1911-1953)
María de las Mercedes Barbudo (1773-1849), Puerto Rican political activist, the first woman Independentista in the island
María de las Mercedes Adam de Aróstegui (1873-1957)
Maria de las Mercedes Santa Cruz y Montalvo (1789-1852)

Dominican Republic
The Feast of the Our Lady of Mercedes of is a national holiday on September 24 in the Dominican Republic.

See also
María Mercedes (disambiguation)

References

Spanish feminine given names